Harrell is a given name and a surname.  Notable people with the name include:

Given name 
Harrell Fletcher (born 1967), American artist
Harrell F. Beck (1922–1987), American preacher

Surname 
 Andre Harrell (1960–2020), American entrepreneur
 Barbara Harrell-Bond (1932–2018), British American social scientist
 Ben Harrell (1911–1981), United States Army general
 Bev Harrell (born 1946), Australian pop singer
 Bob Harrell (1915–2002), American football coach
 Bobby Harrell (born 1956), American politician
 Brett Harrell (born 1961), American politician
 Bruce Harrell (born 1958), Washington state politician
 Calvin Harrell (1949–1994), American and Canadian football player
 Chris Harrell (born 1983), American football player
 Costen Jordan Harrell (1885–1970), American bishop
 Dale Harrell (1974–2009), American matricide victim
 Damian Harrell (born 1975), American football player
 David Edwin Harrell (1930–2021), American historian
 Donwan Harrell, American fashion designer
 Dorothy Harrell (1924–2011), American baseball player
 Gary Harrell (born 1972), American football coach
 Gary L. Harrell (1951-2023), United States Army general
 Glenn T. Harrell, Jr. (born 1945), American judge
 Graham Harrell (born 1985), American football player
 Greg Harrell (born 1961), bobsledder
 James Harrell (American football) (born 1957), American football player
 James A. Harrell, III (born 1974), American politician
 James N. Harrell (1918–2000), American actor
 Jim Harrell, Jr., American politician
 Joey Harrell (born 1985), American basketball player
 John Harrell (born 1947), American baseball player
 John M. Harrell (1828–1907), American lawyer, editor, and writer
 Jules P. Harrell (born 1949), American psychology professor
 Justin Harrell (born 1984), American football player
 Kelly Harrell (1889–1942), American musician 
 Kuk Harrell, American songwriter
 Lucas Harrell (born 1985), American baseball player
 Lynn Harrell (1944–2020), American cellist
 Mack Harrell (1909–1960), American baritone vocalist
 Maestro Harrell (born 1991), American musician and actor
 Montrezl Harrell (born 1994), American basketball player
 Reggie Harrell (born 1981), American football player
 Rebecca Harrell Tickell (born 1980), American producer and director
Ronnie Harrell (born 1996), American basketball player for Hapoel Gilboa Galil of the Israeli Basketball Premier League
 Sally Harrell (born 1966), American politician
 Sarah Carmichael Harrell (1844–1929), American educator, temperance reformer, writer
 Todd Harrell, American musician
 Tom Harrell (born 1946), American jazz trumpeter
 Trajal Harrell (born 1973), American dancer
 Ty Harrell (born 1970), American politician
 Willard Harrell (born 1952), American football player
 William G. Harrell (1922–1964), American recipient of the Medal of Honor

See also
Harrel, surname